Hryhorchuk is a Ukrainian surname derived from the given name "Hryhor", or Gregory. A  variant Ryhorchuk is derived form the simplified variant "Ryhor" of the given name "Hryhor".

The Russified form is Grigorchuk. 
Belarusian forms: Hryharchuk (from Ukrainian), Grygarchuk (via Russian), or Ryharchuk (native or from "Ryhorchuk").
Polonized form: Gregorczuk.
Lithuanized: Grigorčukas (via Russian), Gregorčukas (via Polish)

Notable people with the surname include:

Lidiia Hryhorchuk
Roman Hryhorchuk
Rostislav Grigorchuk

See also

Grigorchuk group

Ukrainian-language surnames